Duquoin is an unincorporated community in Harper County, Kansas, United States.

History
A post office was opened in Duquoin in 1883, and remained in operation until it was discontinued in 1975.

Education
The community is served by Chaparral USD 361 public school district.

References

Further reading

External links
 Harper County maps: Current, Historic, KDOT

Unincorporated communities in Harper County, Kansas
Unincorporated communities in Kansas